The 2020 Cheez-It Bowl was a college football bowl game played on December 29, 2020, with kickoff at 5:30 p.m. EST on ESPN. It was the 31st edition of the Cheez-It Bowl, and was one of the 2020–21 bowl games concluding the 2020 FBS football season. Food manufacturing company Kellogg Company was the title sponsor of the game, through its Cheez-It brand.

Teams
The game featured Oklahoma State of the Big 12 Conference and Miami of the Atlantic Coast Conference (ACC). The teams had previously met once, in a 1991 contest won by Miami, 40–3.

Oklahoma State Cowboys

Oklahoma State entered the game with a 7–3 record (6–3 in conference), 21st in CFP rankings. The Cowboys' losses came against Texas, TCU, and ranked Oklahoma. Oklahoma State had played in one prior edition of the Cheez-It Bowl, winning the 2017 Camping World Bowl when it was known by that name.

Miami Hurricanes

Miami entered the game with an 8–2 record (7–2 in conference), 18th in the AP Poll and CFP rankings. The Hurricanes' two losses were to ranked teams; Clemson and North Carolina. Miami had played in five prior Cheez-It Bowls, when the bowl was known by other names, compiling a 3–2 record.

Game summary

Statistics

See also
2021 Citrus Bowl, played at the same venue three days later
2020 Cure Bowl, played at the same venue three days earlier
2019 Cheez-It Bowl, the prior so-named bowl game, played at Chase Field in Phoenix, Arizona

Notes

References

External links
 Game statistics at statbroadcast.com

Cheez-It Bowl
Cheez-It Bowl
Miami Hurricanes football bowl games
Oklahoma State Cowboys football bowl games
Cheez-It Bowl
Cheez-It Bowl